Cressbrook Dam is one of the three water storages used to supply Toowoomba and the surrounding region in Queensland, Australia. It was constructed in 1983 for the former Toowoomba City Council (now the Toowoomba Regional Council). The other two storages used for Toowoomba are Perseverance Dam and Cooby Dam.

The impoundment of the dam, Lake Cressbrook, has a surface area of 517 hectares with a total capacity of 81,800 mega-litres when full (78,700 ML usable) at an average depth of 15.8 metres. The lake is considered for a 400 MW / 4 GWh (10-hour) pumped-storage hydroelectricity project.

The catchment also contains Perseverance Dam, which is located 10 km upstream of Cressbrook Dam.

Fishing
A Stocked Impoundment Permit is required to fish in the dam.

References

Reservoirs in Queensland
Dams completed in 1983
Darling Downs
Dams in Queensland
Dams in the Murray River basin
1983 establishments in Australia